There are several protected areas of French Guiana, an overseas region and department of France located in South America. As of 2020, 52% of the land territory is protected, and contains one national park, one regional nature reserve, six national nature reserves, two wilderness areas, and 20 sites protected by Conservatoire du littoral.

Wilderness areas 
 Lucifer Dékou-Dékou Biological Reserve. 2012. 644 km2.
 Petite Montagnes Tortue Biological Reserve. 2016. 24 km2.

Nature parks 
 Guiana Amazonian Park. 2007. 20,300 km2.

Nature reserves 
 Amana Nature Reserve. 1998. 148 km2.
 Île du Grand Connétable National Nature Reserve. 1992. 78.5 km2.
 Kaw-Roura Marshland Nature Reserve. 1998. 947 km2.  
 Mont Grand Matoury Nature Reserve. 2006. 21 km2.
 Nouragues Nature Reserve. 1995. 1,000 km2.
 Trésor Regional Nature Reserve. 2010. 25 km2.
 La Trinité National Nature Reserve. 1996. 760 km2.

Protected areas 
 Crique et Pripri Yiyi. 1995. 284 km2.
 . 2013. 0.017 km2.
 . 2015. 5 km2.
 Îlet la Mère. 2000. 0.49 km2.
 Montagne d'Argent. 1998. 7.13 km2.
 Petit Cayenne. 2008. 23 km2.
 Piste de l'Anse. 2008. 18 km2.
 Pointe Liberte. 2015. 0.82 km2.
 Prison of the Annamites. 2012. 2 km2.
 Rivages de Cayenne. 1983. 0.51 km2.
 Rive Droite du Mahury. 2013, 54 km2.
 Salines de Montjoly. 1985. 0.63 km2.
 Salvation Islands. 1979. 0.22 km2.
 Savanes de Wayabo. 2015, 9.7 km2.
 Savanes et Marais de Macouria. 2013. 45 km2.
 Savane Des Peres. 2016. 6.2 km2.
 Voltaire and Vieux Broussard Falls. 2000. 180 km2.

References

External links
 Conservatoire d’Espaces Naturels de Guyane (in French)

Environment of French Guiana
protected areas
French Guiana
 
Protected areas